Sokourala is a village in northwestern Ivory Coast. It is in the sub-prefecture of Mankono, Mankono Department, Béré Region, Woroba District.

Until 2012, Sokourala was in the commune of Sokourala-Mahou. In March 2012, Sokourala-Mahou became one of 1126 communes nationwide that were abolished.

Notes

Populated places in Woroba District
Populated places in Béré Region